Thomas E. Breitenbach (born July 29, 1951 in Queens, New York) is a self-taught American artist best known for his painting Proverbidioms, a raucous and comical depiction of over 300 common proverbs and clichés. He also collaborated with Jim Morrison of The Doors, shortly before Morrison's 1971 death, on a painting intended for use on his An American Prayer album.

He received the Rome Prize Fellowship in visual arts. Breitenbach declined the second year of the fellowship and, inspired by the castles and museums of Europe, returned home determined to build a castle-studio to house his art and eventually become a museum. During the planning stages he painted Proverbidioms and later published it.

Periods and technique
Breitenbach’s earliest works are dark allegories spurred by his vision of man’s nature as being hopelessly irrational and violent. Influenced by Carl Jung, Breitenbach's subjects are constructed using archetypal symbols and are intended to provoke strong emotional responses from the observer. Breitenbach emphasizes that these paintings are not surrealism, because surrealists tend to use personal and dream symbols which are not an effective form of language. He was awarded the Rome Prize in 1973 by the Society of Fellows of the American Academy in Rome in the visual arts category.

In 1974, Breitenbach started work on a painting of contemporary proverbs, idioms, and clichés, after feeling challenged by a review of Pieter Bruegel's 1559 painting of Dutch proverbs, Netherlandish Proverbs, suggesting that language was particularly colorful "back then". This became Proverbidioms, his best-known work, completed in 1975 at the age of 24. This large painting illustrates over 300 common expressions like "You are what you eat", "butterflies in the stomach", "the rat race", and so on, and identifying the sayings became a kind of puzzle for his audience. Proverbidioms has been turned into a poster, jigsaw puzzle, and appeared on the TV show Beverly Hills, 90210 in a few episodes.

After his marriage in 1979 and the birth of his first child, Breitenbach's paintings became particularly colorful. He blames this on the ultra-bright toys that were strewn about the house. He uses traditional Flemish oil-glazes, a meticulous process. Light penetrates the transparent paint layers, striking the pure-white gesso panels (made of chalk and glue) and reflecting back at the viewer, creating a luminous effect.

Jim Morrison triptych
In 1970, while still at college, Breitenbach sent pictures of his artwork to Jim Morrison and offered to paint an album cover. Morrison accepted and sent Breitenbach his ideas for a triptych, along with two autographed, private editions of his poetry. Morrison liked the finished painting and asked if he could use it on an album of poetry he was working on. This was his An American Prayer album published seven years after his death. However, the album’s producers were not aware of Morrison’s intention to use the painting.

Building a castle
In 1976, Breitenbach began constructing by hand a small castle, on land given him by his father. The first stage was an octagon and tower, inspired by the 1848 Victorian-era book The Octagon House by Orson Fowler. Fowler recommended the octagon as an ideal and economical shape for a house. For Breitenbach, it was also suited to a castle. In 1987 he added a large studio addition. Breitenbach quarried stones (some as long as 12 feet) from a nearby creek, cut trees for lumber, and salvaged a collapsing carriage barn for beams and siding. He forged iron hardware, made leaded-glass windows, furniture, carvings, tilework, and a fresco, so that many of the arts would be represented.

Hieronymus, A Musical Fantasy
Hieronymus, A Musical Fantasy is an original musical with music, lyrics, and book by Breitenbach about Hieronymus Bosch "An artist with a 'too-large' imagination". The musical was staged and made its world premiere at Proctors Theater in Schenectady New York in 2016 for the purpose of filming it for public television.

Other art forms
Breitenbach has written an illustrated fantasy novel and a book of painting secrets, composed music for films produced by his son, and written two musicals, including Hieronymus, A Musical Fantasy a partly autobiographical story about medieval fantasy artist Hieronymus Bosch and his over-active imagination.

List of major works

Allegorical paintings
 (1970) The Jim Morrison Triptych 
 (1970, 1985) Misused Cupid 
 (1971) Know as Arc 
 (1971) The Crucifixion 
 (1972) Muchruins 
 (1972, 1985) The Myth of the Cave 
 (1974) Wings 
 (1980) The Temptation of Saint Anybody 
 (2005) The Artist in His Studio: Designing Birds

Puzzle paintings
 (1975) Proverbidioms 
 (1977) Proverbidioms II 
 (1983) Catchpenny 
 (1985) Housecalls 
 (1991) Sporttease 
 (1992) Shakespearience 
 (1994) Eats 
 (1996) Things of the Garden 
 (1999) Ultimate Proverbidioms 
 (2006) A Picture of Health 
 (2007) Proverbidioms IV: Who Missed the Boat?

References

 Scherbeck, Bastian (2005). "Von Bruegel bis Breitenbach: Sprichwortdarstellungen im Wandel der Jahrhunderte"

External links
The artist's poster shop
Hieronymus, A Musical Fantasy Official Website
Hieronymus, A Musical Fantasy Trailers
Proverbidioms, The Art of T. E. Breitenbach - a documentary
A Catalogue Raisonné
An archive of articles, films, and other Breitenbach memorabilia
A History of Proverbidioms
The Jim Morrison Triptych
Watch Breitenbach's Hieronymus Bosch Musical on WMHT
A behind-the-scenes feature produced by WMHT for AHA, titled The Making of T. E. Breitenbach's Hieronymus

1951 births
Living people
People from Queens, New York
20th-century American painters
American male painters
21st-century American painters
University of Notre Dame alumni
Painters from New York City
20th-century American male artists